British NVC community OV11 (Poa annua - Stachys arvensis community) is one of the open habitat communities in the British National Vegetation Classification system. It is one of eight arable weed and wasteland communities of fertile loams and clays.

It is a regionalised community, in which two subcommunities are recognised.

Community composition

The following constant species are found in this community:
 Scarlet pimpernel (Anagallis arvensis)
 Annual meadow-grass (Poa annua)
 Knotgrass (Polygonum aviculare)
 Field woundwort (Stachys arvensis)

One rare species is associated with the community:
 Tall ramping-fumitory (Fumaria bastardii)

Subcommunities

There are two subcommunities:
 the Chenopodium album - Euphorbia helioscopia subcommunity
 the ''Cerastium fontanum - Bryum rubens'' subcommunity

Distribution

This community is mainly confined to south-west England and Wales, and is mostly found among cereal crops on less-limey loams and clay-loams.

References

OV11